Marietta Waters is an American singer and most known for her performance of "Destination Unknown" on the Top Gun soundtrack, where she is credited by the stage name Marietta. Her other soundtrack credits include "By Design" in the movie Perfect, the title track of the movie Fire and Ice, and "Thunder and Lightning" from its sequel, Fire, Ice And Dynamite. "Fire and Ice" was released as a single in 1986, reaching #5 in Switzerland and #10 in Germany.

She has also recorded several albums with Sérgio Mendes, Berlin, Harold Faltermeyer, and Animotion. Marietta has also recorded backup vocals for several artists such as Ringo Starr, Crystal Lewis, Donna Summer, Freddie Ravel, Elton John, Olivia Newton-John, Marc Antoine, and Lee Ritenour. She has worked with producers such as Giorgio Moroder, Harold Faltermeyer, and Michael Jay. Some of Marietta's songs have been recorded by Sérgio Mendes, Donna Summer, Dionne Warwick, and Seals and Croft.

Now living in southern California, Marietta Waters continues to record, perform, and compose. Marietta has recently recorded for Paul Williams and recently performed for a tribute to Hal David. She has also expanded her talents as a singing coach.

Marietta's latest CD, A Call from the Heart, was inspired by her pop, soul, Latin, jazz, R&B, and gospel influences.

References

External links 
 Artist profile and releases according to discogs.com
 Official Myspace page

Year of birth missing (living people)
Living people
American women singers
21st-century American women